La garçonnière ("The bachelor apartment") is a 1960 Italian romance-drama film written and directed by Giuseppe De Santis.

Plot 
A building constructor repeatedly betrays his wife in an apartment he rented in a popular neighborhood. She pawns him, finds out the truth and leaves him. The couple will recover together, but things will never be the same again.

Cast  
Raf Vallone as Alberto Fiorini
Eleonora Rossi Drago as  Giulia Fiorini
Marisa Merlini as  Pupa
 Gordana Miletic as  Laura
Nino Castelnuovo as  Vincenzo
Maria Fiore as  Clementina
Clelia Matania as  Angelina
Ennio Girolami as  Alvaro
Renato Baldini as  Father 
Franca Marzi as   Mother 
Miranda Campa

References

External links

La garçonnière at Variety Distribution

1960 films
Italian romantic drama films
1960 romantic drama films
Films directed by Giuseppe De Santis
Films scored by Mario Nascimbene
1960s Italian films